Diego César Ramos (born 29 November 1972) is an Argentine actor. He is best known for his performance as Germán Castillo in the TV series Violetta.

Biography 
Ramos was born in the clinic Marini in Palermo, a quarter of Buenos Aires, the capital of Argentina. Before he became an actor, graduated from El Colegio San Francisco de Sales in Córdoba and was attending yearlong commercial course. He grew up in Almagro, Buenos Aires City. He has four children.

Filmography

Film

Television

References

External links
 

1972 births
Living people
Male actors from Buenos Aires
Argentine male television actors
Argentine male voice actors
Argentine LGBT actors
21st-century LGBT people
Participants in Argentine reality television series
Bailando por un Sueño (Argentine TV series) participants